F One is FanFan's ninth album which was released on 10 July 2009

Track listing
 1到10=我和你 feat. MC HotDog
 想知道現在你好不好 
 起風 
 灰色的彩虹 
 傻的可以 
 對不起 
 別再生了 
 沒把握 
 愛的盲點 
 微笑說再見

2009 albums
Christine Fan albums